The Auburn City Hall and Fire House, at 1103 High St. in Auburn, California, is a Moderne-style fire station and city hall which was built in 1935.  It was listed on the National Register of Historic Places in 2012.

It was designed by George Clinton Sellon, the first State Architect of California.  It was built during 1935-37 as a Works Progress Administration project.

It has also hosted the Boys & Girls Club Auburn.

In 2018, it holds the Placer County Visitors Bureau/California Welcome Center.

See also 
 Auburn Fire House No. 1
 Auburn Fire House No. 2
 National Register of Historic Places listings in Placer County, California

References

City and town halls on the National Register of Historic Places in California
Fire stations on the National Register of Historic Places in California
National Register of Historic Places in Placer County, California
Moderne architecture in the United States
Government buildings completed in 1935
1935 establishments in California
Works Progress Administration in California
Auburn, California